Peter Toth (born 7 September 1940) is a Brazilian chess FIDE master (FM).

Biography
In the first half of 1970s Peter Toth was one of Brazil's leading chess players. He regularly participated in Brazilian Chess Championships. His best results was shared 3rd-5th place in 1970 and ranked 4th after play-off in 1972. Peter Toth twice participated in Pan American Chess Championships (2009, 2019).

Peter Toth played for Brazil in the Chess Olympiads:
 In 1970, at fourth board in the 19th Chess Olympiad in Siegen (+2, =4, -4),
 In 1972, at fourth board in the 20th Chess Olympiad in Skopje (+8, =4, -2),
 In 1974, at second reserve board in the 21st Chess Olympiad in Nice (+3, =3, -4).

Peter Toth played for Brazil in the World Student Team Chess Championship:
 In 1968, at third board in the 15th World Student Team Chess Championship in Ybbs (+4, =6, -3).

References

External links
 
 
 Peter Toth chess games at 365chess.com

1940 births
Living people
Chess FIDE Masters
Brazilian chess players
Chess Olympiad competitors
20th-century chess players